The Devon and Cornwall Record Society is a text publication society founded in 1904. It publishes scholarly editions of historical records relating to the south west of England.

Selected publications

Old series (before 1955)
1906: A calendar of inquisitions post mortem for Cornwall and Devon, from Henry III to Charles I, 1216-1649, ed. EA Fry 
1906: The Registers of Parkham, JI Dredge
1906: The Register of Baptisms, Marriages and Burials of the Parish of Ottery St. Mary, Devon, 1601–1837, ed. H Tapley-Soper
1910: Subsidy Rolls, Muster and Hearth Tax Rolls, and Probate Calendars of the Parish of St. Constantine (Kerrier) Cornwall
1910: The Registers of Baptisms, Marriages and Burials of the city of Exeter, 2 vols., ed. H Tapley-Soper- vol 1 
1912: Devon Feet of Fines, 2 vols, eds. O Reichel, J Oswald, FB Prideaux, H Tapley-Soper - vol 1
1913: The Registers of Baptisms, Marriages and Burials of the Parish of Branscombe, Devon, 1539-1812, eds. H Tapley-Soper, E Chick
1914: Cornwall Feet of Fines, 2 vols, ed JH Rowe - vol 1
1914: The Register of Baptisms, Marriages and Burials of the Parish of Falmouth in the county of Cornwall, 1663-1812, eds. SE Gay, Mrs H Fox Volume 2.
1917: The Register of Baptisms, Marriages and Burials of the Parish of Parracombe, Devon, 1597-1836, AJP Skinner
1919: The description of the citie of Excester by Iohn Vowell alias Hoker, gentleman and chamberlayne of the same. Transcribed and edited from a manuscript in the archives of the corporation of the city of Exeter, eds. JW Harte, JW Schopp, H Tapley-Soper
1923: The Register of Baptisms, Marriages and Burials of the Parish of  Hemyock, Devon, 1635–1837, with the bishop's transcripts for the years 1602, 1606, 1611, 1617, 1625, 1626, 1633, 1636, and a list of the rectors and chaplain priests, AJP Skinner
1927: The Register of Baptisms, Marriages and Burials of the Parish of Lustleigh, Devon, 1631–1837, and extracts from the bishop's transcripts, 1608–1811, eds. H Johnston, H Tapley-Soper
1928: The Register of Baptisms, Marriages and Burials of the Parish of Colyton, Devon, 1538–1837, AJP Skinner
1930: The Register of Baptisms, Marriages and Burials of the Parish of Halberton, Devon, 1605–1837, CAT Fursdon
1930: The Register of Baptisms, Marriages and Burials of the Parish of Hartland, Devon, 1558–1837, eds. JI Dredge, H Tapley-Soper
1938: The Register of Baptisms, Marriages and Burials of the Parish of Widecombe-in-the-Moor, Devon, eds. EC Wood, H Tapley-Soper 
1938: Parish of Topsham, co. Devon. Marriages, Baptisms and Burials, A.D. 1600 to 1837, from the Parochial register, the Register of the Independent Meeting, the Register of the Presbyterians, the Register of the Quakers, together with copies of memorial inscriptions, ed. H Tapley-Soper - online, Hathi Trust ID 000112302
1940: The Register of Marriages, Baptisms and Burials of the Parish of Plymtree, co. Devon, A.D. 1538 to 1837, ed. E Hay
1945: The Register of Marriages, Baptisms and Burials of the Parish of Camborne, co. Cornwall, A.D. 1538 to 1837, eds. SE Gay, Mrs H Fox, S Fox, H Tapley-Soper
1948: Transcripts of Parish Registers, Bishops’ Transcripts, etc., in the possession of the Society, revised edn.
1954: The Register of Marriages, Baptisms and Burials of the Parish of Lapford, co. Devon, A.D. 1567 to 1837, AR Densham
1954: The Register of the Parish of St. Andrew's, Plymouth, co. Devon, A.D. 1581 to 1618, with Baptisms, 1619–1633, ed. MCS Cruwys

References

External links 
Official website.

1904 establishments in England
History of Devon
Historical societies of the United Kingdom
Text publication societies